Scout may refer to:

Youth movement
Scout (Scouting), a child, usually 10–18 years of age, participating in the worldwide Scouting movement
Scouts (The Scout Association), section for 10-14 year olds in the United Kingdom
Scouts BSA, section for 11 to 17 year olds in the United States of America
Scouts (Baden-Powell Scouts' Association), section is open to both boys and girls between the ages of 10–15 years, and are now formed into local Scout Troops
Scouting, Scouting Movement or Scout Movement
Traditional Scouting, a trend to return Scouting to traditional style and activities
World Organization of the Scout Movement, the international body for Scout organisations
The Scout Association, the national scout organisation for the United Kingdom
Scouting (magazine), a publication of the Boy Scouts of America

Military uses
Scout, to perform reconnaissance

Units

United States
 Blazer's Scouts, a unit who conducted irregular warfare during the American Civil War
United States Army Indian Scouts, Native Americans who were active in the American West in the late 19th–early 20th centuries
Apache Scouts, part of the United States Army Indian Scouts, who performed most of their service during the Apache Wars 
Cavalry scout, a reconnaissance specialist in the United States Army
Philippine Scouts, a military organization of the United States Army from 1901 to 1948
South Pacific Scouts, a jungle warfare unit formed during World War II from Fijians and Solomon Islanders
Scout Sniper, a reconnaissance specialist in the U.S. Marine Corps

United Kingdom and Commonwealth
Lovat Scouts, a Scottish Highland yeomanry regiment of the British Army in the Second Boer War
Grey's Scouts, a Rhodesian mounted infantry unit raised in 1975
Selous Scouts, a special forces regiment of the Rhodesian Army from 1973 to 1980

India
 Ladakh Scouts, an Indian Army high mountain and border security regiment specialized for the Ladakh region
Arunachal Scouts, an Indian Army high mountain regiment specialized for the state of Arunachal Pradesh
Sikkim Scouts, an Indian Army regiment specialized for the state of Sikkim

Pakistan
 Gilgit Baltistan Scouts, an internal security and border force in Pakistan
 Bajaur Scouts
 Chitral Scouts

Equipment
Scout (aircraft), pre-1920s (British) terminology for a single-seat fighter
Scout plane, a type of shipborne surveillance aircraft
Scout rifle, a class of general-purpose rifles
Steyr Scout, a modern scoped bolt-action rifle manufactured by Steyr Mannlicher
AD Scout, a fighter aircraft designed to defend Britain from Zeppelin bombers during World War I
IAI Scout, an unmanned air vehicle used by the Israel Defense Forces during the 1982 Lebanon War
Westland Scout, British military helicopter
HMS Scout, the name of various British Royal Navy ships
USS Scout, the name of various United States Navy ships
Ajax (armoured vehicle), formerly Scout SV, an armoured fighting vehicle

Occupations
 Scout (association football), attends football matches to collect intelligence
 Scout (sport), a professional sports talent-scout
 Scout or bedder, a domestic assistant at Oxford University

Transportation

Aircraft
Aeronca K Scout, an American light airplane first marketed in 1937
Aeryon Scout, a small reconnaissance unmanned aerial vehicle (UAV) designed and built in Canada
American Champion Scout, a two-seat, high-wing, single-engined airplane that entered production in the U.S. in 1974
Eagles Wing Scout, an American powered parachute
Tennessee Propellers Scout, an American powered parachute design

Other transportation
Scout (autonomous boat), an autonomous boat designed to complete a transatlantic crossing
Scout (train), a passenger train of the Atchison, Topeka and Santa Fe Railway, inaugurated in 1916
 Scout Motor Services, now Ribble Motor Services, a bus operator in North West England 
International Harvester Scout, an off-road vehicle which was produced from 1961 to 1980
Scout (automobile), a planned electric vehicle brand owned by Volkswagen Group

Arts and entertainment
 Scout (1987 film), a 1987 British television film by Frank McGuinness in the anthology series ScreenPlay
 Scout (comics), a comic book series by Timothy Truman, first published in 1985
 Scout, a playable class type in the 2007 video game Team Fortress 2

Other uses
 Scout (name), a list of people and fictional characters with the given name Scout
 Scout (operating system), at the University of Arizona
 Scout (rocket family), American launch vehicles designed to place small satellites into orbit around the Earth
 Scout (travel website), a travel website
 Scout.com, a sports publishing company
 Mars Scout Program, a U.S. initiative to send a series of small, low-cost robotic missions to Mars
 Scout, an education toy line of LeapFrog Enterprises

See also

The Scout (disambiguation)

Guide (disambiguation)
Pioneer (disambiguation)
Indian scout (disambiguation)